Akash Singh (born 20 December 1995) is an Indian cricketer. He made his first-class debut for Arunachal Pradesh in the 2018–19 Ranji Trophy on 1 November 2018. He made his List A debut on 8 December 2021, for Arunachal Pradesh in the 2021–22 Vijay Hazare Trophy.

References

External links
 

1995 births
Living people
Indian cricketers
Arunachal Pradesh cricketers
Place of birth missing (living people)